Flemingsberg is a southern suburb of Stockholm, Sweden that is located in Huddinge Municipality in the south-western part of the contiguous Stockholm urban area. 

It is located approximately 15 minutes by Stockholm commuter rail from central Stockholm, or 20–30 minutes by car. Flemingsberg has 12,000 inhabitants, around 12,300 people work there, and there are about 13,000 students studying at Södertörn University. 

There is a railway station (Flemingsberg, formerly Stockholm Syd Flemingsberg), a major hospital, a university college and there are also colourful high-rise residential buildings from the 1970s.

Flemingsberg has also evolved as a law enforcement center for the southern part of metropolitan Stockholm, with police station, court house, prosecutor's office and a jail, all in buildings built in the 1990s onwards.

History
Flemingsberg gets its name from the Flemingsberg manor. The village where the manor house was built in the 17th century was originally called Andersta but the name was changed when it came into the ownership of Henrik Fleming. The current manor house was built in 1790.

The current buildings in Flemingsberg (also called "Flempan" for short) was built during the Million Programme and for a long time there was trouble renting out all the apartments and the area become known as a very bad suburb. The two halves were renamed Visättra and Grantorp as the name Flemingsberg gave bad associations. Today the name Flemingsberg is again used for the area and the railway station.

One notable building is the Flemingsberg Church.

Facilities

The former Huddinge University Hospital is now a part of Karolinska University Hospital at Huddinge in Flemingsberg and is associated with the medical university of Karolinska Institute (Karolinska institutet).
Södertörn University (Södertörns högskola), inaugurated in 1996.
One campus of the Royal Institute of Technology (Kungliga Tekniska Högskolan), is located in southern Stockholm.
Novum Research Park — Genomics and proteomics research and biological sciences park.

Railway station

Flemingsberg is the name of a railway station on the Stockholm commuter rail line between Södertälje and Märsta, via central Stockholm. Trains usually departs within 15 minute intervals both ways. Certain long distance trains with destinations such as Malmö, Gothenburg and Eskilstuna also stop at Flemingsberg. Flemingsberg is one of Sweden's bigger railway stations in terms of the number of passengers.

Metropolitan Stockholm
Stockholm urban area